The Nature Of Connections (released 22 August 2014 in Oslo, Norway on the label Rune Grammofon – RCD2161) is an album by Arve Henriksen.

Background 
On this album, Henriksen is working in harness with some of the most distinguished and dynamic musicians of Norway. They come from different traditions like folk, improvisation and jazz. They bring their specialist competition, where the results are assembled and polished to sparkle. The Nature of Connections almost entirely features pieces composed by the personnel comprising the band on the album, recorded at the legendary Rainbow Studio in Oslo by Jan Erik Kongshaug. The album has closer connections to Nordic folk and contemporary, minimalist chamber music than any of his previous releases.

Track listing

Personnel 
Arve Henriksen - trumpet, piccolo trumpet, piano
Gjermund Larsen – violin, Hardanger fiddle
Nils Økland – violin, Hardanger fiddle, viola d'Amore
Svante Henryson – cello
Mats Eilertsen – double bass
Audun Kleive – drums

Credits 
Design by Kim Hiorthøy
Mixed by Arve Henriksen and Jan Erik Kongshaug
Produced by Arve Henriksen
Recorded by Jan Erik Kongshaug

Notes 
"Blå Veg" arranged by all 
"Arco Akropolis" composed by all 
Recorded and mixed at Rainbow Studio, Oslo

References

External links 
Arve Henriksen Official Website

2014 albums
Arve Henriksen albums
Rune Grammofon albums